Haideoporus texanus is a species of beetle in the family Dytiscidae, the only species in the genus Haideoporus.

References

Dytiscidae